Elida Gera (1932, New York - May 10, 2017, Megadim) was an Israeli  film director, dancer and choreographer. She is the first Israeli female film director who released a feature film (black and white, 1969).  The second one is Michal Bat-Adam with her Moments released ten years later. 

Gera was born in the United States in 1931. She studied dance at Juilliard School, performed off-Broadway  and later worked as choreographer. She became interested in cinema and  studied directing and photography in Canada. There she married an Israeli artist and stage designer  and the two had three sons. In 1964 they emigrated to Israel and settled in Or Yehuda. 

In 2013 her restored film Before Tomorrow was screened at the International Women's Film Festival In Rehovot.

References

1932 births
2017 deaths
Israeli women film directors
Israeli film directors
Israeli dancers
Israeli choreographers